The Alameda Corridor is a  freight rail "expressway" owned by the Alameda Corridor Transportation Authority  that connects the ports of Los Angeles and Long Beach with the transcontinental mainlines of the BNSF Railway and the Union Pacific Railroad that terminate near downtown Los Angeles, California. Running largely in a trench below Alameda Street, the corridor was considered one of the region's largest transportation projects when it was constructed in the 1990s and early 2000s.

Background
Prior to the construction of the Alameda Corridor, cargo traveling by rail to or from the ports of Los Angeles or Long Beach could be routed along the Atchison, Topeka and Santa Fe Railway's Harbor Subdivision or the Southern Pacific Railroad's tracks down Alameda Street. Meanwhile, the Southern Pacific route had more than 200 street-level railroad crossings where automobiles had to wait for lengthy freight trains to pass. Many of those same rail lines were inadequately protected with little more than “wigwag” crossing signals dating from the original construction of the lines.

The ports formed the Alameda Corridor Transit Authority to use the newly acquired right-of-way to begin building a freight rail "expressway" from the ports to the major railyards near Downtown Los Angeles. The trench and the larger Alameda Corridor would allow freight trains to travel  without concerns about grade-crossing collisions or having to blow their horns as they travelled through neighborhoods. The corridor would be open to both BNSF Railway and Union Pacific Railroad (UP) trains via trackage rights.

The line began operation on April 15, 2002, and reached a peak of 60 train movements per day by October 2006. In 2007, the line carried 17,824 trains carrying 4.7 million TEUs (20-foot equivalent units) of containers.

In 2013, the railroad carried 33% of the freight traveling to and from the Ports of Los Angeles and Long Beach. Fifteen percent of the nation’s container traffic travels through the corridor according to the Transit Authority.

Future development

Alameda Corridor–East 
The Alameda Corridor–East project, currently under construction, will grade-separate many of the crossings along UP's Alhambra Subdivision and the Los Angeles Subdivision. Many crossings, which are currently at grade, tie up traffic on north–south streets for long periods multiple times a day as long freight trains pass en route to and from the UP yards in Vernon and Commerce.  The project includes 19 grade separations and elimination of 23 grade crossings.

Included as part of the Alameda Corridor–East project is the $336.9 million San Gabriel Trench, which will submerge the track between Ramona street and San Gabriel Boulevard in San Gabriel. Construction began in 2012 and was completed in 2017.

Possible electrification 
The Alameda Corridor was built in a way to permit electrification with the use of electric catenary wires, which would increase the environmental benefit by displacing the use of diesel fuel; but the electrification has not happened as of yet. This solution has largely been ignored due to lack of familiarity with electric freight technology in North America, although electric freight trains operate in many other parts of the world. Electrification could reduce air pollution in the region, which has been described as a "Diesel Death Zone" due to the pollution from trucks on Interstate 710.

See also
 Urban freight distribution
 Redondo Junction, California

References

External links

Alameda Corridor Transportation Authority
Alameda Corridor East (the ACE Project)

California railroads
Rail lines in California
Landmarks in Los Angeles
Transportation in Long Beach, California
Union Pacific Railroad
Union Pacific Railroad lines
Non-operating common carrier freight railroads in the United States
2002 establishments in California
BNSF Railway lines